Heather Payne (born 26 January 2000) is an Irish women's footballer who plays for U.S. college football team Florida State Seminoles and the Irish national team.

Club career
After playing three seasons with Irish side Peamount United F.C. in the Irish Women's National League, Payne signed with  Bristol City in the English  first division, the FA WSL, in August 2018.

In August 2019, after a season with Bristol, Payne moved to the United States to take up a college scholarship with the Florida State Seminoles, who compete in Division I of the National Collegiate Athletics Association (NCAA) and the Atlantic Coast Conference (ACC).

International
Payne was named to the Ireland senior squad for a 2019 FIFA Women's World Cup-qualifying match against Northern Ireland in August 2018. She made her debut for the team on 31 August 2018 playing as a wing-back.

Honours 
Florida State Seminoles
 NCAA Division I Women's Soccer Championship: 2021

References

External links
Bristol City profile
 

2000 births
Living people
Irish expatriate sportspeople in England
Republic of Ireland women's association footballers
Republic of Ireland women's international footballers
Expatriate women's footballers in England
Bristol City W.F.C. players
Women's Super League players
Women's association football forwards
Peamount United F.C. players
Women's National League (Ireland) players
Florida State Seminoles women's soccer players
Expatriate women's soccer players in the United States
Irish expatriate sportspeople in the United States
Republic of Ireland expatriate association footballers
Republic of Ireland women's youth international footballers
People from Ballinasloe